The Parochial Memories of 1758 are the results of an enquiry sent to every parish in Portugal following the 1755 Lisbon earthquake, by order of Sebastião de Carvalho e Melo, the Secretary of State of Internal Affairs of the Kingdom. The exercise was organised according to a plan containing sixty written questions; the compiled answers, relaying accounts on not only the damage sustained by the earthquake but also information on the local geography, demography, history, and economy, are valuable historical documents and are stored in the country's National Archive.

Because Secretary Carvalho e Melo (today more commonly known by the title of Marquis of Pombal) was the first to attempt an objective description of the broad causes and consequences of an earthquake, he is regarded as a forerunner of modern seismological scientists. By analysing and cross-referencing the parish priests' accounts, modern scientists are able to reconstruct the event with some degree of scientific precision; without the questionnaire, this would have been impossible.

The questionnaire
The enquiry was split in three parts: the first, comprised 27 questions about the settlement; the second, 13 questions about the local landforms, specifically mountains; and the third, 20 questions about the local watercourses.

All three parts ended by asking if there was anything else that was worthy of memory, in an effort to collect more information about the parishes' local peculiarities.

References

Notes

1758 in Portugal
Censuses by country
Parochial Memories
Demographics of Portugal